Statistics of Allsvenskan in season 1972.

Overview
The league was contested by 12 teams, with Åtvidabergs FF winning the championship.

League table

Results

Footnotes

References 

Allsvenskan seasons
Swed
Swed
1